Hoffman is a town in Okmulgee County, Oklahoma, United States. The population was 127 at the 2010 census, a decrease of 14.2 percent from the figure of 148 recorded in 2000.

History
Hoffman was apparently settled before December 18, 1905, when a post office was established. It was originally in McIntosh County until Okmulgee annexed the community in 1918.

The origin of the town name is unclear. The Encyclopedia of Oklahoma History and Culture says that the namesake was either W. Hoffman, vice president of the Missouri, Oklahoma and Gulf Railway, or Roy V. Hoffman, an Oklahoma City attorney.

The population at statehood in 1907 was 344. It fell to 307 in 1910, then rose to a peak of 432 in 1940.

Geography
Hoffman is located at  (35.488374, -95.844721).  The town is northeast of Henryetta off US-266.

Demographics

As of the census of 2000, there were 148 people, 58 households, and 42 families residing in the town. There were 82 housing units at an average density of 313.9 per square mile (121.8/km2). The racial makeup of the town was 68.92% White, 18.24% African American, 10.14% Native American, and 2.70% from two or more races. Hispanic or Latino of any race were 1.35% of the population.

There were 58 households, out of which 32.8% had children under the age of 18 living with them, 53.4% were married couples living together, 13.8% had a female householder with no husband present, and 25.9% were non-families. 22.4% of all households were made up of individuals, and 10.3% had someone living alone who was 65 years of age or older. The average household size was 2.55 and the average family size was 2.91.

In the town, the population was spread out, with 28.4% under the age of 18, 5.4% from 18 to 24, 29.7% from 25 to 44, 25.0% from 45 to 64, and 11.5% who were 65 years of age or older. The median age was 37 years. For every 100 females, there were 100.0 males. For every 100 females age 18 and over, there were 86.0 males.

The median income for a household in the town was $21,607, and the median income for a family was $25,625. Males had a median income of $17,083 versus $20,250 for females. The per capita income for the town was $9,227. There were 28.9% of families and 36.8% of the population living below the poverty line, including 36.8% of under eighteens and 23.1% of those over 64.

References

External links
 Encyclopedia of Oklahoma History and Culture - Hoffman

Towns in Okmulgee County, Oklahoma
Towns in Oklahoma